Thamela Mpumlwana is a Canadian actor. He is most noted for his performance as Sheppard in the 2020 film Akilla's Escape, for which he received a Canadian Screen Award nomination for Best Supporting Actor at the 9th Canadian Screen Awards.

He previously voiced the role of Ramone in the first season of Peg + Cat, and played Tyson Parker in the first season of In the Dark.

References

External links

21st-century Canadian male actors
Canadian male film actors
Canadian male television actors
Canadian male child actors
Canadian male voice actors
Black Canadian male actors
Canadian people of South African descent
Living people
Year of birth missing (living people)